Companhia de Telecomunicações de Macau S.A.R.L. known as CTM is a telecommunications company in Macau, which obtained a monopoly franchise license from the government except for mobile telephone services.

History
Prior to 1981, telecommunications in Macau fell mainly under the purview of Macau Post and Telecommunications. Residents in Macau had to wait many months simply to have a telephone connected. To make a telephone call to Hong Kong was a lengthy procedure which had to be placed through an operator.

On 29 September 1981, an agreement was reached between the then Portuguese Macau government and the British telecommunications company Cable & Wireless plc to set up the new company Companhia de Telecomunicações de Macau S.A.R.L.. Shareholders included Marconi Comunicações Internacionais (the Portuguese operations of the UK-based Marconi Company, acquired by Portugal Telecom (now Altice Portugal) in 2002), CITIC Pacific (later transferred to subsidiary CITIC Telecom International in 2010) and Macau Post.

In June 2013, CITIC Telecom International’s transaction in acquiring the entire shareholding in CTM of both Cable and Wireless Communications and Portugal Telecom was officially approved by the Macau SAR Government. CITIC Telecom International became the controlling shareholder of CTM (99%) with the Macau Postal Savings as the remaining shareholder(1%).

See also
 Telecommunications in Macau

References

Companies of Macau
Telecommunications companies of China
1981 establishments in Macau
2013 mergers and acquisitions
Announced mergers and acquisitions